George Reuben "Rube" Curry (October 10, 1898 – June 11, 1966) was an American pitcher and manager in Negro league baseball. Born in Kansas City, Missouri, Curry made his debut for the Chicago Union Giants in 1919 before coming back to his hometown to star for the Kansas City Monarchs.

Newspaper references of the day often spelled his last name "Currie"; however, historians believe his name was actually spelled "Curry," citing his World War I draft registration card; he was also nicknamed "Black Snake" or "King".

In 1918, 19 year-old Curry registered for the WWI draft. He lists his occupation as "Laborer" for the Armour or Armourdale Company in Kansas City, Kansas. He lists his address as 1723 Woodland Avenue in Kansas City, Missouri, a location that is about two blocks from today's Negro Leagues Baseball Museum. He also lists his nearest relative as Nelson Curry, living at the same address.

Known for his curveball and control, Curry is described by James A. Riley as "one of the best pitchers of the '20s." He played in all of the first four of the Negro World Series held from 1924 to 1927.

Curry managed in later years, coaching the East team in the 1936 East–West game.

References

External links
 and Baseball-Reference Black Baseball stats and Seamheads

Negro league baseball managers
Baseball players from Kansas City, Missouri
Baltimore Black Sox players
Leopardos de Santa Clara players
Kansas City Monarchs players
Chicago American Giants players
Detroit Stars players
Hilldale Club players
1898 births
1966 deaths
Baseball pitchers
American expatriate baseball players in Cuba
20th-century African-American sportspeople
American military personnel of World War I